13th BSFC Awards
December, 1992

Best Film: 
 Unforgiven  
The 13th Boston Society of Film Critics Awards honored the best filmmaking of 1992. The awards were given in 1992.

Winners
Best Film:
Unforgiven
Best Actor:
Denzel Washington – Malcolm X
Best Actress:
Emma Thompson – Howards End
Best Supporting Actor:
Gene Hackman – Unforgiven
Best Supporting Actress:
Judy Davis – Husbands and Wives and Where Angels Fear to Tread
Best Director:
Robert Altman – The Player
Best Screenplay:
Neil Jordan – The Crying Game
Best Cinematography:
Jack N. Green – Unforgiven
Best Documentary:
Brother's Keeper
Best Foreign-Language Film:
Raise the Red Lantern (Da hong deng long gao gao gua) • China/Hong Kong/Taiwan

External links
Past Winners

References 
Boston Critics Group Honors `Unforgiven' Chicago Tribune
1992 Boston Society of Film Critics Awards Internet Movie Database

1992
1992 film awards
1992 awards in the United States
1992 in Boston
December 1992 events in the United States